Planet CCRMA (pronounced karma) is a collection of Red Hat packages (RPMs ) to help set up and optimize a Red Hat-based workstation for audio work.

Overview 

The entire environment, called Planet CCRMA, was developed and tested at Stanford University and made available to the public free-of-charge from a central repository — Planet CCRMA at Home  The Planet CCRMA repositories are maintained at CCRMA by Fernando Lopez-Lezcano.

Installing the packages, transforms a Linux workstation or server into a low-latency system for sound and video production and distribution. The ALSA sound card drivers and other applications are provided without installation hassles and the low-latency is achieved by having applied the real-time preemption patch to the Linux kernel.

Supported Linux distributions 
 Red Hat Linux 7.2, 7.3, 8.0, 9
 Fedora Linux 1, Core 2, Core 3, Core 4, Core 5, Core 6, 7, 8, 9, 10, 11, 12, 13, 14, 15, 16, 17, 18, 19, 20, 21, 22, 24, 28, 29 and 30
 CentOS 5

See also 

 Free audio software
 Digital audio workstation
 Virtual Studio Technology
 Ubuntu Studio - related project for the Ubuntu distribution

External links
 Planet CCRMA at Home

Red Hat software
Free audio software